Neptis occidentalis, the mountain sailer, is a butterfly in the family Nymphalidae. It is found in Nigeria, Cameroon, the Democratic Republic of the Congo, Sudan, Uganda, Kenya and Tanzania. The habitat consists of montane and riparian forests.

Subspecies
Neptis occidentalis occidentalis (Democratic Republic of the Congo: Ituri and Kivu, southern Sudan, Uganda, Kenya, western Tanzania)
Neptis occidentalis batesii Hall, 1930 (Nigeria, Cameroon)

References

Butterflies described in 1868
occidentalis
Butterflies of Africa
Taxa named by Walter Rothschild